Boiga jaspidea commonly known as the jasper cat snake is a species of rear-fanged colubrid that is uncommon throughout its range.

Description
 
Its small and slender body is reddish to chocolate brown, but rich black and white speckles cover the entire body except for the ventrals, which are yellow. In addition, there are faint black lateral bars, and white spots on the ventrolateral area. Its maximum length is 1.5 m (4.9 feet).

Geographic range
Indonesia, Borneo, Peninsular Malaysia, Thailand and southern Vietnam.

Habitat and behavior
The jasper cat snake lives in arboreal habitats in tropical forests, and sometimes among low-lying shrubs. It has been reported to lay up to three eggs in termite nests. Little else is known about this elusive snake.

Diet
The jasper cat snake feeds on geckos and other smaller snakes in the wild.

References

External links 
 Gernot Vogel's Boiga species checklist

jaspidea
Snakes of Southeast Asia
Reptiles of Thailand
Reptiles described in 1854
Taxa named by André Marie Constant Duméril
Taxa named by Gabriel Bibron
Taxa named by Auguste Duméril
Reptiles of Borneo